GoodKnyght! is a 2001  fantasy novel written by Steve Barlow and Steve Skidmore, (known as The Two Steves) as the first part of the Tales of The Dark Forest series. Its sequel, Whizzard! was released in 2002.

Plot summary
Willum, a swineherd and whipping boy for Symon, son of the city's High Lord, longs to go to Knyght School and to become a Knyght. After fighting for Symon in a Tournament for Symon, Willum is sent to Knyght School. After meeting up with a forest-dwelling girl named Rose, an Italian restaurateur named Luigi, Humfrey the Boggart, a Pryvate Inquestigator with a speech impediment, a sarcastic harp and a wizard known as The Runemaster who carries the Dragonsbane; a stone which can be used to access the mind of a dragon. When the Dragonsbane is stolen, Willum, Rose and the Harp travel to The Ragged Mountain to retrieve it.

References

External links
 (official)

2001 British novels
2001 children's books
Children's fantasy novels
British children's novels
HarperCollins books